Deep Rock Galactic is a cooperative first-person shooter video game developed by Danish studio Ghost Ship Games and published by Coffee Stain Publishing. Deep Rock Galactic was fully released on May 13, 2020 for Windows and Xbox One after spending two years in early access. The game was later released for PlayStation 4 and PlayStation 5 in January 2022, and for Xbox Series X/S in September 2022.

Deep Rock Galactic is set on the alien planet of Hoxxes IV, whose caves are rich in minerals but filled with hostile wildlife and hazardous environments. The player controls a dwarf miner employed by Deep Rock Galactic, an intergalactic mining corporation that sends employees into the caves of Hoxxes IV to extract resources. Players can team up with up to three other dwarfs on missions into the planet, where they must navigate procedurally generated caves and complete objectives while fighting alien swarms. 

The game received positive reviews from critics, who praised its class-based gameplay and atmosphere. The game has sold over five million units as of January 2023 and has been part of the Xbox Game Pass subscription service since November 2020. It was also available to PlayStation Plus subscribers during the month of its release.

A spin-off, Deep Rock Galactic: Survivor, was announced in March 2023. It is a shoot 'em up game by Funday Games. It is set to be released on early access in 2023.

Gameplay
Deep Rock Galactic is a cooperative first-person shooter video game. Gameplay primarily centers around missions that take place in fully destructible, procedurally generated cave systems; these can have varying terrain generation, objectives, hazards, and enemies depending on the selected biome and mission type. Upon landing in a cave via an orbital drop pod, players must complete a mission objective such as mining resources or repairing abandoned equipment. While doing so, they must fight hostile aliens, manage a limited supply of ammunition, and navigate the cave. Once the objective is completed, players can start an extraction sequence, where players must backtrack through the cave to an escape pod in order to safely exit along with all collected resources. Players can play missions solo or with up to three other players. Before starting each mission, players choose one of four playable classes: Scout, Engineer, Gunner, and Driller. Each class has a unique loadout of weapons and tools, giving them varied capabilities in combat and navigation. By working together to take advantage of how these different capabilities interact, teams can more efficiently navigate a cave, complete objectives, and fight enemies. For example, the Engineer class can place platforms on walls, while the Scout class has a personal grappling hook. In order to mine a difficult-to-reach mineral deposit high up on a wall, an Engineer could place a platform beneath the deposit and a Scout could then grapple on top of it to safely mine the deposit. When playing solo, players can choose to be accompanied by a drone which assists with objectives and combat. 

The game also features progression systems. Players can purchase new weapons, equipment upgrades, and cosmetics for each dwarf using credits and crafting minerals obtained from missions. By completing challenges, players can also acquire perks; these give dwarves additional abilities, such as increased run speed. Since 2021, there have been seasonal events in which players can unlock items via a free battle pass-like system.

Development 
Deep Rock Galactic is the first game developed by Ghost Ship Games. The team has stated that they took inspiration from both Minecraft and Left 4 Dead, and felt that a problem with Left 4 Dead was that it was unbalanced for new players who wanted to play with veterans, as such they wanted to design a game where all teammates would be on even footing regardless of experience. 

Deep Rock Galactic entered early access on February 28, 2018, where it stayed for two years prior to its full release in 2020. Ghost Ship Games used the early access model to get community feedback in order to determine which features to prioritize. The low-poly art style was chosen for its efficiency in adding content. The most difficult part of development was creating the procedural world generator. Deep Rock Galactic used Unreal Engine for development and was made with the engine's Blueprint scripting for quick iteration. 

The game continues to be developed, with intermittent updates adding new biomes, equipment, and accessories. Since November 4th, 2021, Ghost Ship Games has begun releasing content in themed season updates. These center around new enemy types and add new equipment, missions, and cosmetics. Currently, the game is on Season 3, released on November 3rd, 2022 for PC.

Reception 

The Early Access version of Deep Rock Galactic was well received by critics, who praised the game's atmosphere and challenging levels. Multiple reviewers compared parts of the experience to Left 4 Dead. The full version of the game was released on May 13, 2020.  On Metacritic, the game has a score of 85, indicating "generally favorable reviews." As of January 2023, the game had over 145,000 user reviews and an "Overwhelmingly Positive" rating on Steam. 

Nic Reuben of Rock, Paper, Shotgun enjoyed how the game's classes meshed well together, and were each viable for co-op, saying that "each class is both viable and enjoyable". Matt Miller of Game Informer appreciated how the unique secondary objectives gave the game a risk/reward dynamic.

Phil Iwaniuk, writing for PC Gamer, enjoyed the tension that the exfiltration phase brought to each mission, and the persistent upgrades that let the player customize their dwarf. Leana Hafer of IGN praised the distinct abilities of each of the dwarves and the low-poly visual style, but criticized the game for its connection issues, saying "About one in every five missions, I’d run into connection issues that could cause other players to lag severely and disconnect."

Ghost Ship Games had stated that Deep Rock Galactic had sold over 2 million units by January 2021, 3 million sales by November 2021, 4 million copies by June 2022., and 5.5 million copies by January 2023.

In March 2021, Ghost Ship Games and Coffee Stain Publishing won Indie Game of the Year and Excellence in Multiplayer awards at South by Southwest.

References

External links

 
 Official game manual

2020 video games
Coffee Stain Studios games
Cooperative video games
Early access video games
First-person shooter multiplayer online games
Indie video games
Multiplayer and single-player video games
PlayStation 4 games
PlayStation 5 games
Unreal Engine games
Video games developed in Denmark
Video games set on fictional planets
Video games using procedural generation
Windows games
Xbox Cloud Gaming games
Xbox One games
Xbox Series X and Series S games